Amrita Raichand is an Indian actress and celebrity chef who appears in films and TV series.

Acting career 
She made her film debut with Humko Ishq Ne Mara, which released in 1997. The film starred Ashish Chaudhary in the lead, was directed by Arjun Sablok and produced by Yash Chopra. Raichand has also starred in Baat Bann Gayi, co-starring Anisa Butt, Ali Fazal and Gulshan Grover released on October 11, 2013, and worked in Kaanchi as third wife of Rishi Kapoor. She has worked in the Doordarshan music show Ek Se Badhkar Ek along with Mukul Dev. She was a judge on Punjab De SuperChef - Season 4, a Punjabi cooking reality show telecast on PTC Punjabi.

Other ventures 
Amrita Raichand is also known as the host of Mummy Ka Magic which airs on the TV channel Food Food. In 2018 she was a judge along with Saransh Goila and Sanjeev Kapoor on India's Digital Chef.

Filmography

Films

Television

References

External links

 

21st-century Indian actresses
Living people
Year of birth missing (living people)
Indian chefs
Indian female models
Indian television actors
Actresses from Jharkhand